Melich is a surname. Notable people with the surname include:

Lukáš Melich (born 1980), Czech hammer thrower
Mitchell Melich (1912–1999), United States Department of the Interior official
Tanya Melich, American feminist
Vlastimil Melich (1928–1978), Czechoslovak Nordic combined skier